Alofoke FM is a Dominican radio station located in Santo Domingo. It transmits on 99.3 MHz from the Alofoke Music Group building with an effective radiated power of 42,900 watts (class C1). It airs an urban contemporary and tropical rhythms and is owned by Santiago Matías and Ozuna and operated by Santiago's media company Alofoke Music Group. Its studios and offices are located at the Alofoke Music building at Calle Virgilio Díaz Ordóñez #52, Santo Domingo, Dominican Republic.

History

Early years 
The station first signed on as HIPJ on october 24th, 1987 and started with an effective radiated power of 10,000 watts, the studios were located at 27 de Febrero ave. and It was founded by the Dominican radio host and producer José Lluberes and branded as Sonido Suave. It began as a Spanish-language Bolero and Ballad station serving what is now the Distrito Nacional, later adding more soft adult contemporary, English-language music for younger listeners and a news segment, as well as expanding its reach to the Greater Santo Domingo.

On october 4, 2021, Sonido Suave was rebranded as Alofoke FM after it was bought by Santiago Matías and Ozuna during the same year, changing its format from a Bolero, Ballad and soft adult contemporary to an urban contemporary.

References 

Radio stations in the Dominican Republic
Spanish-language radio stations
Radio stations established in 1987